Adela droseropa is a species of moth of the family Adelidae. It is known from South Africa.

References

Endemic moths of South Africa
Adelidae
Moths of Africa
Moths described in 1921